Yaisnier Nápoles Espinosa (born 20 October 1987), is a Cuban international footballer that plays for the Cuba national football team.

Club career
Nápoles plays for his provincial team Camagüey.

International career
He was called up to and made his international debut for Cuba's national team at the 2015 CONCACAF Gold Cup. He played in Cuba's opening game against Mexico, a 6–0 loss. Nápoles was also called-up for the Copa Centenario qualifier against Panama. He has, as of April 2018, earned a total of 13 caps, scoring no goals.

References

External links
 
 

1987 births
Living people
Association football defenders
Cuban footballers
Cuba international footballers
FC Camagüey players
2015 CONCACAF Gold Cup players
21st-century Cuban people